Private Internet Access (PIA) is a personal VPN service that allows users to connect to multiple locations. In 2018, former Mt. Gox CEO  Mark Karpelès was named chief technology officer of PIA's parent company, London Trust Media. In November 2019, Private Internet Access was acquired by Kape Technologies.

Company

The CEO of Private Internet Access (and its parent company, London Trust Media, Inc.) is Ted Kim. The company was founded by Andrew Lee. Lee started the company PIA because he wanted a way to prevent Internet Relay Chat from revealing IP addresses.

On November 18, 2019, Private Internet Access announced that it would be merged into Kape Technologies, which operates three competing VPN services, Cyberghost, ExpressVPN and Zenmate. Some users objected to the acquisition, as Kape (under its former name, Crossrider) previously developed browser toolbars bundled with potentially unwanted programs.

History 

Founded in 2010, Private Internet Access was formed under parent company London Trust Media and entrepreneur Andrew Lee.  The company was formed due to Lee’s interest to take privacy mainstream. The goal of the company is to create the “next VPN” and to do this they open-sourced their client software code for everyone to use. During their acquisition by Kape Technologies, PIA had to assure their users that privacy and security will remain the company’s top priority as they continue to work under Kape’s umbrella. However, due to Kape Technologies history, a good amount of faith in PIA was lost.

After merging with Kape Technologies, Private Internet Access became one of many privacy software products offered by the corporation. Along with Private Internet Access, Kape also offers Cyberghost, Intego, Webselenese and Restoro. Previously Crossrider, a UK-based company, Kape Technologies changed their name in 2018 in order to go under a type of rebranding and "escape a strong association to the past activities of the company" through which they had issues with their previous image being associated with traffic manipulation. After purchasing various other VPN services, Kape Technologies purchased Private Internet Access in order to "aggressively expand their footprint in North America".

Reception 
In a 2021 review from TechRadar, Private Internet Access was given a four out five star rating and described as being "A likeable VPN which gives you plenty for your money". According to the review, its most notable features include removing restrictions from streaming services such as Netflix, Amazon Prime Video and Disney+.

PIA also received a positive review from Tom's Guide in November 2021, which highlighted the service's kill switch feature, compatibility with torrents, and "no logging" policy. Tom's Guide found PIA's speeds to be average among VPN services, and stated that a third-party audit would improve the service's credibility.

In a December 2021 test, PCMag determined that PIA reduced "download and upload speeds by just 10.9% and 19.4%, respectively", which was the smallest speed reduction among VPNs tested by the publication at the time. PCMag praised PIA's server selection, connection limit (10 devices), and app, but noted that the service had not yet undergone a third-party audit.

In 2022, PIA invited Deloitte, one of the big four auditing firm, to examine its no logs policy and VPN server network. Following the audit, Deloitte Audit Romania announced that, as of June 30 2022, the server configurations align with internal privacy policies and are not designed to identify users or pinpoint their activities.

See also 

 Comparison of virtual private network services

References

External links 
 

Internet privacy
Virtual private network services
Internet properties established in 2010
2010 establishments in the United States